La última esperanza (English title: The last hope) is a Mexican telenovela produced by 	Eugenio Cobo for Televisa in 1993.

Mariana Levy and Alberto Mayagoitia starred as protagonists, while Pedro Armendáriz, Jr, Cecilia Gabriela, Florencia Ferret, Adalberto Parra and Jesús Arriaga starred as antagonists.

Plot 
"La Última Esperanza" is a slum where they live humble and hardworking and others that are not. Here lives Estelita, an orphan girl working mother looking constantly and tries to raise her father, an alcoholic and depressive.

Entrepreneurship, vital, kind, Estelita meets Daniel, a young millionaire playboy dedicated to the fleeting romance and the good life that gives the big money, money she inherited from her deceased parents. Daniel immediately falls for her, who is not like other women who usually deal with, but choose a path unwise to reach his heart, calling himself Angel and pretend to be more than a poor neighborhood.

Cast 
 
Mariana Levy as Estelita
Alberto Mayagoitia as Daniel Burana/Ángel Pérez
Pedro Armendáriz, Jr. as Alejandro Burana
Salvador Sánchez as Pancho
Cecilia Gabriela as Jennifer Lascuráin
Luis Gatica as José
Elsa Cárdenas as Ninfa
Miguel Pizarro as Father Juan Lamparero
Jaime Lozano as "El Gallo"
Héctor Ortega as Don Moy
Jesús Arriaga as Manuel Prieto "El Piraña"
Coco Levy as Pablo
Juan Carlos Serrán as Mariano
Eugenio Cobo as Sócrates
José Suárez as Luis Ceballos "El Caireles"
Carolina Guerrero as Polita Ríos
Patricia Hernández as Gloria Chávez
Adalberto Parra as Fraga
Bárbara Gil as Isabel
Silvia Suárez as Diana
Florencia Ferret as Nora
Héctor Parra as Tte. Ramos
Rosita Pelayo as Melanie
Klaus Feldman as Jacobo
Jorge Páez as "Kid Acero"
Azela Robinson
Violeta Isfel
Jorge Alberto Bolaños
Juan David Burns
Yula Pozo
Azucena Rodríguez
Carlos Amador
Francois Clemencau
Carlos Chavira
Esteban Escarcega
Maripaz García
Janina Hidalgo
María Morena
Baltazar Oviedo
Evelyn Solares
Edmundo Lima
Juan Antonio Llanes
Lorena Martínez
Rubén Monterrubio

References

External links

1993 telenovelas
Mexican telenovelas
1993 Mexican television series debuts
1993 Mexican television series endings
Spanish-language telenovelas
Television shows set in Mexico
Televisa telenovelas